The International Film Festival of India (IFFI), founded in 1952, is one of the film festivals in Asia. Held annually, currently in the state of Goa, on the western coast of the country, the festival aims at providing a common platform for the cinemas of the world to project the excellence of the film art; contributing to the understanding and appreciation of film cultures of different nations in the context of their social and cultural ethos, and promoting friendship and cooperation among people of the world. The festival is conducted jointly by the National Film Development Corporation of India (under the Ministry of Information and Broadcasting) and the state Government of Goa.

Vision 
Ayam nijam paroveti gananā laghuchetasām, Udāracharitānām tu vasudhaiva kutumbakam

(Extract from the Vedic scripture Maha Upanishad, meaning "This is for me and that is for other – is the thinking of a narrow-minded person. For those who are broad-minded, liberals, or noble people, the entire world is one big family.")

History

First IFFI
The 1st edition of IFFI was organized by the Films Division, Government of India, with the patronage of the first Prime Minister of India. Held in Mumbai from 24 January to 1 February 1952, the Festival was subsequently taken to Madras, Delhi, Calcutta and Trivandrum. In all it had about 40 features and 100 short films. In Delhi, the IFFI was inaugurated by Prime Minister Pt Jawaharlal Nehru on 21 February 1952.

The first edition was non-competitive, and had 23 countries including the United States participating with 40 feature films and about a hundred short films. The Indian entries for the festival were Awara (Hindi), Pathala Bhairavi (Telugu), Amar Bhoopali (Marathi) and Babla (Bengali). This was the first International Film Festival held anywhere in Asia. The notable world panorama during the festival were Bicycle Thieves, Miracle in Milan, and Rome, Open City from Italy. Yukiwarisoo (Japan), The Dancing Fleese (UK), The River (USA) and The Fall of Berlin (USSR).

Third IFFI
It was for the first time that the Indian Film Industry was exposed to a vast range of outstanding post-war era films. From the 3rd edition in January 1965, IFFI became competitive. It has since then moved to Trivandrum, the capital of Kerala. In 1975 the Filmotsav, non-competitive and to be held in other film-making cities in alternate years, was introduced. Later, Filmotsavs were merged into IFFI. In 2004 the IFFI was moved to Goa from Trivandrum. Since then IFFI has been an annual event and competitive.
The venue for the second festival held in 1961 which was also non-competitive was New Delhi. The third edition of the festival was chaired by Satyajit Ray. For the first time the festival became competitive, and was graded ‘A’ category by the Paris – based Federation International de Producers de Films. With this recognition the festival in India came on par with Cannes, Berlin, Venice, Karlovy Vary, and Moscow International film festivals.

Following this recognition, India adopted, at its fifth festival in 1975, a permanent insignia. This comprises a representation of the peacock, India’s national bird, with a permanent motto of the festival ‘Vasudhaiva Kutumbakam’ (The whole world is a family). The same year it was decided to hold a non-competitive festival of festival films (Filmotsav) alternating with IFFI. While the Filmotsavs were organized at major film – producing centres of India, IFFI was held in New Delhi only.

The venue being the same for all festivals, the fourth and fifth festivals were held from 5–18 December 1969 and 30 December 1974-12 January 1975 respectively. From the sixth festival onwards the period, as well as the dates for the festival, were fixed as 3–17 January every alternate year. The sixth festival was held in 1977 and silver peacock for best actor, actress, and director was awarded for the first time. A film market was also set up for the first time by the IMPEC. The Indian Panorama section was instituted from this edition.

Following a decision taken in August 1988 by the Ministry of Information and Broadcasting that 3 more editions of festivals in future will be interim non-competitive, and all festivals would be called International Film Festival of India (IFFI). The "Filmotsavs" and IFFI 90-91-92 together constituted 23 editions of the festival

Chronology of IFFI and Filmotsav

Permanent venue
Since 2004, starting from the 35th edition, the International Film Festival of India, became globally competitive, and moved to its permanent venue Goa, and is being held during the months of November and December of each year.
The dates for the festival vary each year and there are no fixed dates.

IFFI Awards

Main Prize - Golden Peacock Award
Best Feature Film
Best Short Film (Discontinued)

Silver Peacock Award
Best Feature Film (Discontinued)
Best Director
Best Actor
Best Actress
Best Debut Film of a Director
Special Jury Award and Special Mention

Special Award
ICFT UNESCO Gandhi Medal
Satyajit Ray Lifetime Achievement Award
Indian Film Personality of the Year Award

Miscellany 
 The first IFFI was held in 1952, and American director Frank Capra attended as a part of the US delegation.
 On the eve of IFFI 2006, journalist and author Mario Cabral e Sa's book Location Goa, highlighting Goa's contribution to the Hindi film world, was released on 21 November 2006.
 Since 2004, Goa has hosted IFFI every year. This brings in more visitors to the State, and also coincides with the novenas and feast of the 16th-century Basque missionary-saint Francis Xavier.
In 2017 edition, IFFI recognized the innovative works of 15 people and companies that had made significant contribution in developing technologies related to media. A special exhibition was held to showcase their work throughout the course of the festival. The recognized personalities included Mithaq Kazimi, Greg Acuna among others.
 In January 2021, due to Covid-19 pandemic, the 51st edition of IFFI for year 2020 was held as hybrid event, there was physical and virtual screening of 50 films out of 224 films across various categories. In addition many online events were organised. Two Goan films were selected for screening in premium and non-premium sections.

 The 52nd IFFI opened on  20 November and closed on 28 November 2021 in Goa. Like the 51st edition, this edition was also held in a hybrid format, which combines online and face-to-face participation. In the 2021 festival, on the occasion of the birth centenary of Satyajit Ray, the Directorate of Film Festivals paid tribute to him through a 'Special Retrospective' of 11 specially curated films. Lifetime achievement award, in recognition of the auteur's legacy, was named the 'Satyajit Ray Lifetime Achievement Award' this year.

See also
 List of Indian winners and nominees of the Academy Awards
 List of Indian winners and nominees at the Cannes Film Festival

References

External links 
Official Festival Website operated by Entertainment Society of Goa 
Commemorating the first edition of IFFI – broken link
Pandit Nehru inaugurating the first IFFI, NPL auditorium, Feb 21, 1952
IMDb

 
Indian film festivals
Festivals in Goa